Dennis Wann (born 17 November 1950) is an English former professional footballer who played as a winger. He played in The Football League for seven clubs.

Playing career
Wann began his career with hometown side Blackpool, whom he turned professional with in July 1967. He made 17 league appearances over the next five years before Football League Third Division side York City. Loan spells at Chesterfield and Hartlepool United followed and in July 1976 he began a three-year stint with Darlington.

Wann remained in the Football League Fourth Division after a switch to Rochdale in June 1979, scoring seven league goals in his two seasons at Spotland. A short spell back at Blackpool followed and Wann then dropped out of the professional ranks with a spell at non-league Workington. In October 1983 Wann returned to The Football League with Chester City, whom he joined on non-contract terms. After three league games and one League Cup tie Wann returned to Workington. He later had a brief spell with Runcorn.

External links
Hartlepool United career details
Details on Wann and other 1970-71 Blackpool players

References

1950 births
Living people
Sportspeople from Blackpool
English footballers
English Football League players
National League (English football) players
Association football wingers
Blackpool F.C. players
York City F.C. players
Chesterfield F.C. players
Hartlepool United F.C. players
Darlington F.C. players
Rochdale A.F.C. players
Chester City F.C. players
Workington A.F.C. players
Runcorn F.C. Halton players